EFO may refer to:

 Eddie From Ohio, an American folk band
 Einsatzstab Fähre Ost, a World War II German naval detachment
 Emmett Furla Oasis Films, a company specializing in action movies
 Energy For Opportunity, a Canadian development charity
 Errors, freaks, and oddities, non-standard stamps
 Étoile Filante de Ouagadougou, a Burkinabe football club
 Euroformula Open Championship, a single-seater racing championship
 Experimental factor ontology
 Établissements Français de l'Océanie, now French Polynesia